Et or Yt (majuscule: Ը: minuscule: ը; Armenian: ըթ) is the eighth letter of the Armenian alphabet created by Mesrop Mashtots in the 5th century. It has a numerical value of 8. It represents the mid-central unrounded vowel (/ə/). This letter is similar to the Armenian letter Րր except that it has a horizontal line jutting to the right from the bottom.  This letter is unique to its own right; it can only  appear in the beginning and the end of a word. Because of this, any pronunciations of this vowel in the middle of any word will be transcribed as having no Et (for example, the word փրկել has ə, but its transcription has no ը).

Computing codes

Gallery

See also
 Armenian alphabet
 Mesrop Mashtots
 Mid central vowel

References

External links
 Ը on Wiktionary
 ը on Wiktionary

Armenian letters